Henry Neville or  Nevile may refer to:

Henry Neville (died c.1415), MP for leicestershire
Henry Neville, 5th Earl of Westmorland (1525–1564), English peer
Henry Neville (Gentleman of the Privy Chamber) (c. 1520–1593)
Henry Neville (died 1615) (1564–1615), English ambassador and politician
Henry Neville (writer) (1620–1694), English author and satirist
Henry Grey (MP) (1683–1740), formerly Neville, English MP
Henry Gartside Neville (1837–1910), British actor and theatre manager
Henry Gladstone, 1st Baron Gladstone of Hawarden (1852–1935), British businessman and politician
Henry Neville (Rector) (1822–1889), Irish priest and educator
Henry Neville, 7th Baron Braybrooke (1855–1941), Baron Braybrooke
Henry Nevile (Lord Lieutenant of Lincolnshire) (1920–1996), English farmer, local politician and local administrator

See also
 Henry Nevill (disambiguation)